Rongchang railway station is a railway station on the Chengdu–Chongqing railway. The station is located in Rongchang District, Chongqing, China.

Stations on the Chengdu–Chongqing Railway
Railway stations in Chongqing
Railway stations in China opened in 1953
1953 establishments in China